Shalbandi Sharif is an administrative unit, known as Union council of Buner District in the Khyber Pakhtunkhwa province of Pakistan.

District Buner has 6 Tehsils i.e. Daggar, Chagharzai, Chamla, Khudu Khel, Gagra and Gadezai. Each tehsil comprises certain numbers of union councils. There are 27 union councils in Buner District.

This village is spiritual center for Chishti Order in Sufism. The village is visited by thousands of Shalbandi Baba followers called (masakeens) from all over the world to pay respect and to gain blessings from this holy site. 

Four occasions are celebrated here every year:

 10th of Muharram-ul-Haram
 12th of Rabi-ul-Awal
 6th of Rajab-ul-Murajab (Urs of Mehmood Shah & Khawaja Moin-ud-Din Chishti)
 1st of March (Urs of Babar Badshah s/o Mehmood Shah)

See also 

 Buner District

References

External links
United Nations
Hajjinfo.org Uploads
PBS paiman.jsi.com

Buner District
Populated places in Buner District
Union councils of Khyber Pakhtunkhwa
Union Councils of Buner District